Cheneyville is an unincorporated community in Grant Township, Vermilion County, Illinois.

History
Cheneyville was founded in 1871 and platted in 1880.  It was named for J. H. Cheney, the vice-president of the Lake Erie and Western Railroad.  A telephone system was installed in 1888 and soon had to be expanded due to rising demand.

Geography
Cheneyville is located at  (40.4692031, -87.5847437), about four miles east of the village of Hoopeston and less than two miles south of the northern border of the county.  The Kankakee, Beaverville and Southern Railroad passes through town and Illinois Route 9 runs about half a mile to the south.

References

External links
NACo

Unincorporated communities in Vermilion County, Illinois
Unincorporated communities in Illinois
Populated places established in 1871
1871 establishments in Illinois